Steinar Gullvåg (born 27 October 1946 in Trondheim) is a Norwegian politician for the Labour Party.

He was elected to the Norwegian Parliament from Vestfold in 2005.

Gullvåg was a member of Nøtterøy municipality council from 1979 to 1987 and 2003 to 2007.

The son of Eigil Gullvåg, long-time editor of the newspaper Arbeider-Avisa, Steinar Gullvåg originally worked as a journalist, starting in Arbeider-Avisa. He took over as editor-in-chief in Hardanger Folkeblad 1973–1977 and in Vestfold Arbeiderblad 1977–1983. From 1994 to 2005 he was information director of the Directorate of Public Roads.

References

1946 births
Living people
Labour Party (Norway) politicians
Members of the Storting
Vestfold politicians
Norwegian newspaper editors
21st-century Norwegian politicians